MStar Semiconductor, Inc. was a Taiwanese fabless semiconductor company specializing in mixed-mode integrated circuit technologies, based in Hsinchu Hsien. MStar made hardware for multimedia and wireless communications, in the form of display ICs and mixed-mode (i.e. combining analog and digital functions) ASIC/IPs, in addition to chip sets for GSM mobile handsets. MStar employed approx. 1300 in more than 10 branches worldwide. The company's revenue was around US$1067 million in 2010. The growth has been substantial, their revenue in 2005 was US$175 million. MStar is listed on the Taiwan Stock Exchange under the code 3697.

MStar was often referred as "Little-M" or "Morning Star" in Chinese community, as a contrary part of the bigger semiconductor company "Big-M", a.k.a. MediaTek.

MStar was a spin-off (2-1 stock split) from System General Technology in May 2002, where the power IC product line stayed in System General Technology while the employees with the display and RFID product lines transferred to the new spin-off. After the spin-off, System General Technology regretted the decision, and a 1-2 stock swap was taken to exchange the two companies back to their corresponding shareholders. Chairman and CEO of MStar was Wayne Liang (梁公偉), while Dr. Steve Yang (楊偉毅) was the executive vice president and co-founder.

In 2004, after being involved in a court case where in a ruling by the International Trade Commission (ITC), MStar Semiconductor were found guilty over infringing on a patent held by Genesis Microchip for a method to improve images on liquid-crystal-display (LCD) monitors and flat screen TVs.

On October 14, 2020, MStar came under investigation by the US International Trade Commission for allegedly infringing patents held by DIVX LLC of San Diego, California, USA.

Merger with MediaTek 

On 22 June 2012 MediaTek Inc. announced it purchased 212 million to 254 million shares of MStar ( - 40% to 48% of its outstanding shares) for 0.794 MediaTek shares and NT$1 in cash per MStar share.

Comparison table

See also
 List of companies of Taiwan

References

Taiwanese companies established in 2002
ARM architecture
Embedded microprocessors
Fabless semiconductor companies
System on a chip
Semiconductor companies of Taiwan
Companies based in Hsinchu
Taiwanese brands
Electronics companies established in 2002